George Alboiu (6 July 1944 in Roseți, Ialomița) is a Romanian poet.

Biography
Alboiu studied literature at the University of Bucharest between 1963 and 1967. His first poem, Luceafărul, was written in 1964 while at university but his first published work was Câmpia eternă (1968).

Selected works
 Câmpia eternă (București, Editura pentru Literatură, 1968).
 Cel pierdut (București, Editura pentru literatură, 1969).
 Edenul de piatră (București, Editura Cartea Românească, 1970).
 Drumul sufletelor (București, Editura Albatros, 1970).
 Joc în patru, poezii pentru copii (București, Editura Ion Creangă, 1970).
 Gloria lacrimei (București, Editura Cartea Românească, 1971).
 Cumplita apoteoză (București, Editura Cartea Românească, 1973).
 Stâlpi (București, Editura Cartea Românească, 1974).
 Poeme (București, Editura Eminescu, 1975).
 Poemele câmpiei (București, Editura Cartea Românească, 1978).
 Aventura continuă (București, Editura Eminescu, 1980).
 Metoda şoimului (București, Edi¬tura Eminescu, 1981).
 Turnir (1987).
 Roata lumii (București, 1994).
 Câmpia eternă, antologie, cu o prefaţă semnată de V. F. Mihăescu, București, 2001.

References

1944 births
Living people
People from Ialomița County
Romanian male poets
University of Bucharest alumni
20th-century Romanian poets
20th-century Romanian male writers